Lee Dong-hyun (born 19 November 1989) is a South Korean football player who plays as a forward for South Korean club that K League Challenge side FC Anyang.

Club career
On 17 November 2009, Gangwon called him as 4th order at 2010 K-League Draft. His first K-League match was against Daegu FC in Daegu that draw by 2–2 in away game by substitute on 2 May 2010. Since 2011, he move to Korea National League side Gangneung City FC in the same city.

Statistics

References

External links
 

1989 births
Living people
Association football forwards
South Korean footballers
Gangwon FC players
Gangneung City FC players
Daejeon Hana Citizen FC players
Ulsan Hyundai Mipo Dockyard FC players
FC Anyang players
Korea National League players
K League 1 players
Kyung Hee University alumni